The Nager Kovil school bombing refers to an airstrike that took place on  September 22, 1995, when the Sri Lankan Air Force bombed the Nagar Kovil Maha Vidyalayam school in Jaffna, resulting in the death of, by varying accounts, 34-71 Sri Lankan Tamil civilians, primarily schoolchildren and the injury of many more.
Sri Lankan Defense Spokesman admitted the incident but claimed that it was a  LTTE facility and most of the dead were LTTE cadres. Journalists and human rights organizations reported the imposition of censorship and the airstrike took place about 12 hours after the Government imposed press censorship on reporting military events.

Accounts and reactions

University Teachers for Human Rights (Jaffna) 
According to University Teachers for Human Rights (UTHR), a Jaffna-based organization, the staff of Nagarkovil Government School noticed bomber activity by the Sri Lanka Air Force around the school the morning of Friday, September 22, 1995. Several children who had come out of school had sheltered under a tree, waiting for the bombers to leave. About 12:45 pm a bomb fell near the tree, instantly killing 39 and injuring others. Some people injured by the bombing later died from their wounds.

Human Rights Watch
The 1996 HRW annual country report described "a major offensive on the Jaffna peninsula" by the Sri Lankan government which began on September 22, and which included curbs on war-related reporting by both the domestic and international press. "Among the first stories to be subjected to these censorship requirements were reports that on September 21 and 22, heavy shelling and aerial attacks by government forces on the northern Jaffna region had killed some seventy civilians, including many school children." Human Rights Watch also cited a Reuters report from September 23 that the army had denied the incident and that the story had been "subjected to military censors, who deleted quotes from civilians on the reported deaths of twenty children."

Australian Foreign Ministry 
In a letter of October 6, 1995, the Australian government expressed a concern about "tragic incidents where non combatant Tamil civilians have been killed in military exchanges," mentioning "the reported deaths of 44 school children when a school was bombed at the village of Nagarkovil on September 22."

References

External links
Nagaerkovil victims remembered

1995 crimes in Sri Lanka
Aerial bombing in Sri Lanka
Attacks on buildings and structures in Sri Lanka
Attacks on civilians attributed to the Sri Lanka Air Force
Massacres in Sri Lanka
Mass murder in 1995
Mass murder of Sri Lankan Tamils
School bombings
School massacres
September 1995 events in Asia
Sri Lankan government forces attacks in Eelam War III
Terrorist incidents in Sri Lanka in 1995